The Municipality of Burwood (also known as Burwood Council) is a local government area in the inner-west of Sydney, in the state of New South Wales, Australia. The Mayor of the Municipality is Cr. John Faker, a member of the Labor Party. The municipality is 7km², making it the second smallest Local Government Area, being larger than only Hunter's Hill

History
The municipality was established on 27 March 1874. The council chambers are located on Conder Street and were designed and built by architect Jack Hennessy in 1877. Hennessy was later a mayor of Burwood.

In May 2016, Strathfield Council challenged the proposed merger and commenced proceedings in the New South Wales Land and Environment Court. After the Court heard that there were legal flaws in the report from the State Government appointed delegate who examined the proposal for merging the councils, the NSW Government withdrew from the case and the merger proposal stalled. In July 2017, the Berejiklian government decided to abandon the forced merger of the Strathfield, Burwood and Canada Bay local government areas, along with several other proposed forced mergers.

Suburbs in the local government area 
The following suburbs within the Municipality of Burwood are:
 Burwood
 Burwood Heights
 Enfield
 Enfield South

The Municipality also includes portions of:
 Croydon (shared with Inner West Council)
 Croydon Park (shared with the City of Canterbury-Bankstown and Inner West Council)
 Strathfield (shared with the City of Canada Bay and Municipality of Strathfield)

Demographics
Aboriginal and Torres Strait Islander people made up 0.4 per cent of the population; significantly below the NSW and Australian averages of 2.9 and 2.8 per cent respectively. The median age of people in the Municipality of Burwood was 34 years. Children aged 0 – 14 years made up 4.2 per cent of the population and people aged 85 years and over made up 2.9 per cent of the population. The largest age group was 20-24 (12.4 per cent). Of people in the area aged 15 years and over, 43.7 per cent were married and 9.4 per cent were either divorced or separated.

At the 2016 census, the population in the Municipality increased by 13.53 per cent. When compared with total population growth of Australia for the same period, being 8.8 per cent, population growth in Burwood local government area was significantly higher than the national average. The median weekly income for residents within the Municipality of Burwood of was generally on par with the national average.

At the 2021 census, the proportion of residents in Burwood local government area who stated their ancestry as Chinese was 6 times the national average; and the proportion of households where an Asian language was spoken at home was only slightly higher than the national average (1.4 times).

Council

Current composition and election method
Burwood Council comprises seven Councillors, including the Mayor, for a fixed four-year term of office. Since 2012, the Mayor has been directly-elected while the six other Councillors are elected proportionally as one ward. The most recent election was held on 4 December 2021, and the makeup of the council, including the Mayor, was as follows:

The current Council, elected in 2021, in order of election, is:

State and Federal government
In the NSW Legislative Assembly, the Municipality of Burwood falls into the electorate of Strathfield. 

For Federal elections it is in the electorates of Reid (north of Hume Highway) and Watson (south of Hume Highway).

Heritage listings
The Municipality of Burwood has a number of heritage-listed sites, including the following sites listed on the New South Wales State Heritage Register:
 Burwood, 168a Burwood Road: Burwood Post Office
 Burwood, 205 Burwood Road: St Paul's Anglican Church, Burwood
 Burwood, 213 Burwood Road: The Priory, Burwood
 Burwood, 223 Burwood Road: St. Cloud, Burwood
 Burwood, 4 Clarence Street: Lynton, Burwood
 Burwood, Great Southern and Western railway: Burwood rail underbridge
 Burwood, Great Southern and Western railway: Burwood railway station, Sydney
 Burwood, Railway Parade: Burwood Sewer Vent
 Croydon, Boundary Street: Shubra Hall
 Croydon, Paisley Road: Croydon Sewer Vent
 Strathfield, 62 The Boulevarde: Trinity Uniting Church, Strathfield

Council Logo
Burwood Council introduce in September 2019 a new bold logo designed to reflect the changes which have made it a vibrant and multicultural destination while retaining its heritage. The new logo design, based on the letter 'B', is divided into six parts for the suburbs of the area: Burwood, Burwood Heights, Croydon, Croydon Park, Enfield and Strathfield. Residents' priorities are represented by the colour scheme: harmony and friendship (pink), trust and stability (light blue), creativity and vibrancy (orange), heritage and heart (red), the natural environment (green) and energy and optimism (yellow). Traditional typeface has been used in keeping with the commitment to heritage.

The previous 'Municipality of Burwood' logo was designed in 1936.

See also

List of local government areas in New South Wales
Local government areas of New South Wales

References

External links
Burwood Council website

 
Burwood
Burwood
Hume Highway